The following is a list of notable deaths in February 2011.

Entries for each day are listed alphabetically by surname. A typical entry lists information in the following sequence:
 Name, age, country of citizenship at birth, subsequent country of citizenship (if applicable), reason for notability, cause of death (if known), and reference.

February 2011

1
Ernst Badian, 85, Austrian classical scholar and history professor (Harvard University), complications from a fall.
Lennox Fyfe, Baron Fyfe of Fairfield, 69, British politician.
Daniele Formica, 61, Irish-born Italian actor, theatre director and playwright, pancreatic cancer.
Douglas Haig, 90, American child actor.
André Laronde, 70, French archaeologist, heart attack.
Stanisław Michalski, 78, Polish actor.
Derek Rawcliffe, 89, British Anglican prelate, Bishop of Glasgow and Galloway (1981–1991).
Knut Risan, 80, Norwegian actor.
Husik Santurjan, 91, Turkish-born Armenian archbishop of Armenian Apostolic Church.
Les Stubbs, 81, British footballer.

2
Geoff Ainsworth, 64, Australian football player, cancer.
Federico Aguilar Alcuaz, 78, Filipino painter.
Edward Amy, 92, Canadian brigadier general.
Ian Anderson, 57, British politician, brain tumour.
Darrel Baldock, 72, Australian football player and coach, member of the Tasmanian House of Assembly (1972–1987) and Minister (1975–1982), stroke.
Harriett Ball, 64, American educator, heart attack.
Daniela Castelo, 42, Argentine journalist and radio host, cerebral aneurysm.
*Armando Chin Yong, 53, Malaysian opera singer, heart disease.
Jimmy Fell, 75, British footballer (Grimsby Town), natural causes.
Bill Foster, 78, American television director (Benson, Full House, The Mystery of Al Capone's Vaults), cancer.
Defne Joy Foster, 31, Turkish actress, presenter and VJ.
Awal Gul, 48, Afghan detainee in Guantanamo Bay Detention Camp, heart attack.
Douglas M. Head, 80, American politician, Minnesota Attorney General (1967–1971), natural causes.
Rodney Hill, 89, British mathematician.
Clark Hulings, 88, American realist painter and physicist.
Margaret John, 84, British actress (High Hopes, Gavin & Stacey, Game of Thrones), liver cancer.
Durga Mukherjee, 77, Indian cricketer.
Eric Nicol, 91, Canadian writer.
René Verdon, 86, French-born American White House Executive Chef, leukemia.

3
Ajib Ahmad, 63, Malaysian politician, Chief Minister of Johor (1982–1986).
Édouard Glissant, 82, Martinican poet and writer.
LeRoy Grannis, 93, American surfing photographer.
Tony Levin, 71, British jazz drummer.
Ron Piché, 75, Canadian baseball player (Atlanta Braves, St. Louis Cardinals), cancer.
Maria Schneider, 58, French actress (Last Tango in Paris), cancer.
Tatyana Shmyga, 82, Russian operetta singer and film actress (Hussar Ballad), People's Artist of the USSR, vascular disease.
Machan Varghese, 50, Indian Malayalam film actor, cancer.
Neil Young, 66, British footballer (Manchester City), cancer.
Robert Young, 95, American Olympic silver medal-winning (1936) athlete.

4
Lu Bain, 68, Canadian football player.
Martial Célestin, 97, Haitian lawyer and diplomat, Prime Minister (1988).
Woodie Fryman, 70, American baseball player (Detroit Tigers, Montreal Expos).
Michael Habeck, 66, German actor, after short illness.
Dame Olga Lopes-Seale, 92, Guyanese-born Barbadian broadcaster and singer.
Ahmed Mohamed Mahmoud, 37, Egyptian journalist, shot.
Lena Nyman, 66, Swedish actress (I Am Curious (Yellow), I Am Curious (Blue), Autumn Sonata), cancer.
Vasile Paraschiv, 82, Romanian political activist and dissident.
Tura Satana, 72, American actress (Faster, Pussycat! Kill! Kill!), heart failure.
Earl Irvin West, 90, American church historian.
Lee Winfield, 64, American basketball player (Seattle SuperSonics, Buffalo Braves), colon cancer.

5
Fanizani Akuda, 78, Zimbabwean sculptor.
Omar Amiralay, 67, Syrian filmmaker, heart attack.
Eugeniusz Czajka, 83, Polish Olympic field hockey player.
Ruth H. Funk, 93, American LDS Church youth leader (The Church of Jesus Christ of Latter-day Saints).
John Paul Getty III, 54, American heir and kidnapping victim, grandson of J. Paul Getty and father of Balthazar Getty, after long illness.
Miriam Hansen, 61, American cinema scholar and professor (University of Chicago), cancer.
Brian Jacques, 71, British fantasy author (Redwall), heart attack.
Adjie Massaid, 43, Indonesian actor, under-23 national football team manager and politician, heart attack.
Hiroko Nagata, 65, Japanese radical and murderer, vice-chairman of United Red Army.
Donald Peterman, 79, American cinematographer (Flashdance, Men in Black, Cocoon), complications from myelodysplastic syndrome.
Pertti Purhonen, 68, Finnish Olympic bronze medal-winning (1964) boxer, Alzheimer's disease.
Martin Quigley, Jr., 93, American publisher, spy and author.
Peggy Rea, 89, American character actress (Grace Under Fire, The Dukes of Hazzard, Step by Step, The Waltons), heart failure.
Charles E. Silberman, 86, American journalist and author (Criminal Violence, Criminal Justice), heart attack.
Pavel Vondruška, 85, Czech conductor and actor, accidental fall.
Albert Yator, 17, Kenyan long-distance runner, world junior steeplechase medallist, bronchopneumonia.

6
Andrée Chedid, 90, Egyptian-born French poet and novelist.
Isabelle Corey, 71, French film actress, cancer.
Billy Gallier, 78, British footballer (Tamworth) and manager.
Josefa Iloilo, 90, Fijian politician, President (2000–2006; 2007–2009).
Gary Moore, 58, Irish rock guitarist and singer (Thin Lizzy), heart attack.
William Morais, 19, Brazilian footballer (América-MG), shot.
John Nisby, 74, American football player (Pittsburgh Steelers, Washington Redskins), pneumonia.
Ken Olsen, 84, American engineer, co-founder of Digital Equipment Corporation.
Aurel Smith, 95, Australian politician, member of the Victorian Legislative Assembly.
James Watson, 59, British trumpeter, heart attack.

7
Maria Altmann, 94, Austrian-born American art heiress, after long illness.
Jerry Ames, 80, American tapdancer and choreographer.
Hysen Hakani, 78, Albanian screenwriter and director, directed first Albanian short film.
Bobby Kuntz, 79, American CFL player (Toronto Argonauts, Hamilton Tiger-Cats), Parkinson's disease.
Eric Parsons, 87, British footballer.
Ralph Pöhland, 64, German Olympic skier.
Frank Roberts, 65, Australian boxer, first Australian Aboriginal Olympian (1964), heart attack.

8
Nick Arundel, 83, American journalist and publisher, pulmonary failure.
Roza Baglanova, 89, Kazakh singer, People's Artist of the USSR.
Luiz Bueno, 74, Brazilian race car driver, cancer.
Elaine Crowley, 83, Irish author.
Cliff Dapper, 91, American baseball player (Brooklyn Dodgers).
Bradley C. Livezey, 56, American ornithologist, car accident.
Tony Malinosky, 101, American baseball player (Brooklyn Dodgers).
Marie-Rose Morel, 38, Belgian politician, cancer.
Jorma Ojaharju, 72, Finnish author.
Charles O. Perry, 81, American sculptor, stomach cancer.
Angelo Reyes, 65, Filipino general and politician, suicide by gunshot.
Cesare Rubini, 87, Italian basketball player and coach, water polo player.
Donald S. Sanford, 92, American film and television writer (Midway).
Marvin Sease, 64, American blues singer, pneumonia.
Ferbent Shehu, 78, Albanian dancer and choreographer, heart attack.
Eugenio Toussaint, 56, Mexican composer and jazz musician, heart attack.

9
Olga de Angulo, 55, Colombian Olympic swimmer.
Miltiadis Evert, 71, Greek politician and minister, Mayor of Athens (1987–1989) and President of New Democracy (1993–1997), after a long illness.
Leroy R. Hassell, Sr., 55, American jurist, Justice of the Virginia Supreme Court (since 1989) and Chief Justice (2003–2011).
David Sánchez Juliao, 65, Colombian author.
Jimmy Lemi Milla, 62, Southern Sudanese politician, shot.
Alicia Pietri, 87, Venezuelan First Lady (1969–1974; 1994–1999), widow of President Rafael Caldera.
Ronald Walker, 85, Australian cricketer.

10
Trevor Bailey, 87, British Test cricketer and BBC radio broadcaster (Test Match Special), house fire.
Emory Bellard, 83, American college football coach (Texas A&M University, Mississippi State University), creator of wishbone offense, amyotrophic lateral sclerosis.
Doug Davis, 66, American football player (Minnesota Vikings).
Claus Helmut Drese, 88, German theatre and opera administrator.
Saad el-Shazly, 88, Egyptian military leader.
Michael Harsgor, 86, Israeli historian.
Bill Justice, 97, American animator (Peter Pan, Bambi, Alice in Wonderland), natural causes.
Blanche Honegger Moyse, 101, American conductor.
Oleg Lavrentiev, 84, Russian nuclear physicist.
Jon Petrovich, 63, American journalist, executive at CNN, cancer.
Sam Plank, 62, British radio broadcaster, cancer.
Fred Speck, 63, Canadian ice hockey player (Detroit Red Wings).
Lynne Walker, 54, British music and theatre critic, cancer.
Józef Życiński, 62, Polish Roman Catholic prelate, Archbishop of Lublin (since 1997), myocardial infarction.

11
Nubia Barahona, 10, American child abuse victim, beaten.
Bad News Brown, 33, Canadian rapper and harmonica player, beaten and shot.
Sir Arthur Bryan, 87, British businessman.
Tom Carnegie, 91, American sports announcer (Indianapolis Motor Speedway).
Bo Carpelan, 84, Finnish poet and author.
John Clay, 86, English cricketer.
Steve Dacri, 58, American magician, cancer.
Joe R. Greenhill, 96, American attorney, Chief Justice of the Texas Supreme Court (1972–1982).
Roy Gussow, 92, American sculptor (Infinity), heart attack.
Gerry Huth, 77, American football player (New York Giants, Philadelphia Eagles, Minnesota Vikings).
Christian J. Lambertsen, 93, American diving engineer, inventor of first SCUBA device, renal failure.
Earle Morris, Jr., 82, American politician, Lieutenant Governor of South Carolina (1971–1975).
Josef Pirrung, 61, German footballer, cancer.
Chuck Tanner, 82, American baseball manager (Chicago White Sox, Pittsburgh Pirates) and player (Los Angeles Dodgers), after long illness.

12
Peter Alexander, 84, Austrian actor and singer.
Ching Arellano, 50, Filipino actor and comedian, heart failure.
Kevin Barry, Sr., 74, New Zealand boxing coach, after long illness.
Gino Cimoli, 81, American baseball player (Brooklyn Dodgers, Pittsburgh Pirates), heart and kidney complications.
Mato Damjanović, 83, Croatian chess grandmaster.
Hal Dean, 89, American football player (Los Angeles Rams).
Ernesto De Pascale, 52, Italian music promoter, producer and critic.
Mark C. Ebersole, 89, American educator.
James Elliott, 82, British-born Australian actor (Number 96), Lewy body dementia.
Betty Garrett, 91, American actress, singer and dancer (On the Town, All in the Family, Laverne & Shirley), aortic aneurysm.
Fedor den Hertog, 64, Dutch cyclist and Olympic medallist, prostate cancer.
Andrzej Kłopotowski, 75, Polish Olympic swimmer.
Konstantinos Kosmopoulos, 83, Greek politician, Mayor of Thessaloniki (1989–1999), cardiac arrest.
Kenneth Mars, 75, American actor (Young Frankenstein, The Producers, The Little Mermaid), pancreatic cancer.
John Monson, 11th Baron Monson, 78, British aristocrat and politician, head injuries following a fall.
Kyllikki Naukkarinen, 85, Finnish Olympic hurdler
Saleh Abdul Aziz Al Rajhi, 90, Saudi Arabian businessman, founder of Al-Rajhi Bank, heart attack.
Bridgett Rollins, 54, American model (Playboy), cancer.
Joanne Siegel, 93, American widow of Superman co-creator Jerry Siegel, reported model for the character of Lois Lane.
Vipindas, 72, Indian cinematographer and director, short illness.
Frank Whitten, 68, New Zealand actor (Outrageous Fortune), cancer.

13
Arnfinn Bergmann, 82, Norwegian ski jumper and Olympic champion, after brief illness.
Bustanil Arifin, 85, Indonesian politician.
Manuel Esperón, 99, Mexican composer and actor, respiratory arrest.
Louis Grisius, 74, Luxembourgian Olympic cyclist.
Oakley Hall III, 60, American playwright, heart attack.
Dona Hardy, 98, American actress (The Truman Show, When Harry Met Sally..., Superbad), natural causes.
Inese Jaunzeme, 78, Latvian javelin thrower and Olympic gold medalist (1956 Melbourne).
Nobutoshi Kihara, 84, Japanese electronics engineer for Sony.
Paul Marcus, 56, British television producer, cancer.
T. P. McKenna, 81, Irish actor (The Avengers, Doctor Who).
Brian Shaw, 79/80, British rugby league player.
*Shi Yafeng, 91, Chinese geologist.

14
Sean Boru, 57, Irish actor and author.
Paul Briggs, 90, American football player (Detroit Lions).
Tommy Burns, 88, Australian boxer.
Peter Feteris, 58, Dutch footballer.
David F. Friedman, 87, American film producer (Blood Feast), heart failure.
Cecil Kaiser, 94, American Negro league baseball player, injuries from a fall.
Catherine Clark Kroeger, 85, American author, professor and New Testament scholar, brief illness.
Ali Abdulhadi Mushaima, 21, Bahraini protester, gunshot.
Peter Pilkington, Baron Pilkington of Oxenford, 77, British academic and life peer, Chairman of the BCC (1992–1996).
Sir George Shearing, 91, British-born American jazz pianist (Lullaby of Birdland), heart failure.
John Strauss, 90, American film and television composer (Amadeus, Car 54, Where Are You?), Parkinson's disease.

15
Liliane Atlan, 79, French Jewish writer, cancer.
Dame Judith Binney, 70, New Zealand historian and author.
Charles Epstein, 77, American geneticist and Unabomber victim, pancreatic cancer.
Joe Frazier, 88, American baseball player (St. Louis Cardinals) and manager (New York Mets).
Dorian Gray, 83, Italian actress, suicide by gunshot.
Sidney Harth, 85, American violinist and conductor, respiratory complications.
Olavi Manninen, 82, Finnish Olympic runner.
George Marsaglia, 87, American mathematician and computer scientist. developed diehard tests, heart attack.
Fadhel Al-Matrook, 31, Bahraini protester, gunshot.
François Nourissier, 83, French journalist and writer, complications from Parkinson's disease.
Frank Nyangweso, 71, Ugandan Olympic boxer.
Cyril Stein, 82, British businessman.

16
Hans Joachim Alpers, 67, German writer and editor of science fiction and fantasy.
Neal Amundson, 95, American chemical engineer.
William A. Bablitch, 69, American politician, Wisconsin State Senator (1983–2003) and Wisconsin Supreme Court Justice (1983–2002).
Alfred Burke, 92, British actor (Public Eye, Enemy at the Door), chest infection.
Jack Calfee, 69, American economist and author, heart attack.
Tonny van Ede, 86, Dutch football player (Sparta Rotterdam).
Len Lesser, 88, American actor (Seinfeld, Everybody Loves Raymond, Kelly's Heroes), cancer-related pneumonia.
Justinas Marcinkevičius, 80, Lithuanian poet and playwright.
Santi Santamaria, 53, Spanish chef, heart attack.
David Shapiro, 58, American jazz musician, atherosclerotic cardiovascular disease.
Tu Jida, 83, Chinese aircraft designer (Nanchang CJ-6, Shenyang J-5A, Chengdu JJ-5, Chengdu J-7).

17
Hilal Al-Ahmadi, 56–57, Iraqi journalist, shot.
John Stanley Beard, 95, British-born Australian forester and ecologist.
Ricky Bell, 36, American football player (Chicago Bears, Jacksonville Jaguars, Winnipeg Blue Bombers).
George Clarke, 89, British footballer (Ipswich Town).
Dave Duerson, 50, American football player (Chicago Bears, Phoenix Cardinals, New York Giants), suicide by gunshot.
Francis Anthony Gomes, 79, Bangladeshi Roman Catholic prelate, Bishop of Mymensingh (1987–2006).
Ron Hickman, 78, South African-born British inventor (Black & Decker Workmate, Lotus Elan).
Steve Horn, 79, American politician, U.S. Representative from California (1993–2003), complications from Alzheimer's disease.
*Augustine Hu Daguo, 88, Chinese Roman Catholic underground bishop of Guiyang.
George Lewis, 93, Trinidad and Tobago Olympic track and field athlete.
James McLure, 59, American playwright.
Michelle Monkhouse, 19, Canadian fashion model, car accident.
Bill Monroe, 90, American journalist, host of Meet the Press (1975–1984), complications from hypertension.
Perry Moore, 39, American author (Hero) and film producer (The Chronicles of Narnia), apparent drug overdose.
Vivien Noakes, 74, British literary critic, cancer.
*Gustave Olombe Atelumbu Musilamu, 83, Congolese Roman Catholic prelate, Bishop of Wamba (1968–1990).

18
Paulo de Tarso Alvim, 91–92, Brazilian biologist.
Cayle Chernin, 63, Canadian actress (Goin' Down the Road), cancer.
Chloe Dzubilo, 50, American artist, musician and activist.
John M. Falcone, 44, American police officer Poughkeepsie, New York, shot.
Len Gilmore, 93, American baseball player (Pittsburgh Pirates).
Spook Jacobs, 85, American baseball player (Philadelphia Athletics/Kansas City Athletics, Pittsburgh Pirates).
Catherine Jourdan, 62, French actress, pulmonary embolism.
Buddy Lewis, 94, American baseball player (Washington Senators), cancer.
Abdost Rind, 27, Pakistani journalist, shot.
Walter Seltzer, 96, American film producer (Soylent Green, The Omega Man).
Marshall Stoneham, 70, British physicist, complications of surgery.
Bob Tanna, c. 96, Indian amateur radio operator.
Tykhon Zhylyakov, 42, Ukrainian Orthodox Bishop of Kremenchuk and Lubny (since 2009), cardiac arrest.

19
Suresh Babu, 58, Indian Olympic athlete, cirrhosis.
Florinda Chico, 84, Spanish actress, respiratory disease.
Norman Corner, 68, British footballer.
Donald L. Cox, 74, American leader of the Black Panther Party.
Ollie Matson, 80, American Hall of Fame football player (St. Louis Rams, Philadelphia Eagles), complications from dementia.
Anson Rainey, 81, American academic and author, pancreatic cancer.
Ernő Solymosi, 70, Hungarian Olympic bronze medal-winning (1960) football player.
Dietrich Stobbe, 72, German politician, Mayor of West Berlin (1977–1981).
David R. Thompson, 80, American federal judge.
Max Wilk, 90, American playwright, screenwriter and author.
Richard L. Williams, 87, American jurist, senior District Judge for the Eastern District of Virginia (1980–2011), natural causes.
*Yuan Xuefen, 88, Chinese Yue opera actress.

20
Ted Bates, 84, American politician.
Drew Baur, 66, American banker, co-owner of the St. Louis Cardinals, heart attack.
Eddie Brandt, 90, American composer and songwriter.
Raphaël Bretton, 91, French Oscar-winning set decorator (Hello, Dolly!, The Towering Inferno, The Poseidon Adventure).
Barbara Harmer, 57, British aviator, first female Concorde pilot, cancer.
Betty Hicks, 90, American golfer (LPGA Tour), Alzheimer's disease.
Troy Jackson, 35, American basketball player (AND1 Mixtape Tour).
Tony Kellow, 58, British footballer (Exeter City).
Jay Landesman, 91, American publisher, writer and nightclub proprietor, husband of Fran Landesman.
Frank A. McClintock, 90, American mechanical engineer.
Sir Fred Phillips, 92, Kittitian politician, Administrator (1966–1967) and Governor of Saint Christopher-Nevis-Anguilla (1967–1969).
Helmut Ringelmann, 84, German film and television producer, organ failure.
Noemí Simonetto de Portela, 85, Argentine Olympic silver medal-winning (1948) athlete.
Malaysia Vasudevan, 66, Indian actor and playback singer, heart failure.
Mehdi Mohammed Zeyo, 49, Libyan activist, explosion.

21
Robert Albo, 78, American physician, surgeon and amateur illusionist.
Odón Alonso, 85, Spanish conductor and composer.
Jean Baeza, 68, French footballer.
Wolfgang Baumgart, 61, German hockey player.
Bob Boyd, 55, American professional golfer, leukemia.
Ben Fricke, 35, American football player (Dallas Cowboys), colon cancer.
Edwin D. Kilbourne, 90, American research scientist and influenza vaccine expert.
Dick Klugman, 87, Australian politician, member of the House of Representatives (1969–1990).
Anne Mathams, 97, Scottish education and disability campaigner.
Dwayne McDuffie, 49, American comic book writer (Static Shock, Damage Control) and animator (Justice League Unlimited), complications following heart surgery.
Bernard Nathanson, 84, American pro-choice activist and co-founder of NARAL, later anti-abortion activist and writer, cancer.
Jerzy Nowosielski, 88, Polish painter, graphic artist, scenographer and illustrator.
Russell W. Peterson, 94, American politician, Governor of Delaware (1969–1973), stroke.
Ken Pillar, 86, British Anglican prelate, Bishop of Hertford (1982–1989).
Aranmula Ponnamma, 96, Indian actress.
Swami Premananda, 59, Sri Lankan-born Indian religious leader, convicted rapist and murderer.
Haila Stoddard, 97, American actress and Broadway producer, cardiopulmonary arrest.
Judith Sulzberger, 87, American physician, pancreatic cancer.
Antonín Švorc, 77, Czech operatic bass-baritone.

22
Kjell Bjartveit, 83, Norwegian physician and politician.
Brian Bonsor, 84, Scottish composer and music teacher.
George Buksar, 84, American football player (Chicago Hornets, Washington Redskins).
Nicholas Courtney, 81, British actor (Doctor Who).
Bill Deck, 95, American Negro league baseball player.
Beau Dollar, 69, American singer and drummer, long illness.
Jean Dinning, 86, American songwriter ("Teen Angel"), sister of Mark Dinning.
Jo Giles, 61, New Zealand television personality and sportswoman, earthquake.
Chari Gómez Miranda, 80, Spanish journalist and television presenter.
Ion Hobana, 80, Romanian science fiction author.
Amanda Hooper, 30, New Zealand field hockey representative, earthquake.
Jud McAtee, 91, Canadian-born American ice hockey player (Detroit Red Wings, Chicago Blackhawks).
James R. McCartney, 90, American politician, Secretary of State of West Virginia (1975–1977).
Bill Nimmo, 93, American radio and television announcer (Who Do You Trust?, The Jackie Gleason Show) and game show host (Keep It in the Family).
Ivo Pavelić, 103, Croatian footballer and Olympic swimmer.

23
Lev Barashkov, 79, Russian actor.
Matthew Carr, 57, British figurative artist, leukaemia.
James Damman, 78, American politician, Lieutenant Governor of Michigan (1975–1979), cancer.
Joseph Flom, 87, American corporate lawyer, heart failure.
Rebekah Johansson, 29, Swedish model, apparent suicide.
Gustav Just, 89, German journalist and politician.
Jean Lartéguy, 90, French soldier, war correspondent and writer.
Frank Prout, 89, British Olympic sprint canoer and businessman.
Nirmala Srivastava, 87, Indian spiritual leader, founder of Sahaja Yoga religious movement.
Mike Zimring, 94, American radio actor and theatrical agent.

24
Margaret Hope Bacon, 89, American Quaker historian, author and lecturer.
Yozhef Betsa, 81, Ukrainian Olympic gold medal-winning (1956) footballer.
Jerrold Kessel, 66, South African-born Israeli journalist (CNN), cancer.
Anant Pai, 81, Indian educator and comics creator (Amar Chitra Katha).
Mullapudi Venkata Ramana, 80, Indian Telugu screenplay writer.
Robert Reguly, 80, Canadian journalist (Toronto Star), heart disease.
Attila Takács, 82, Hungarian Olympic gymnast.
Harry Walsh, 97, Canadian lawyer, complications from a fall.
Jens Winther, 50, Danish jazz trumpet player, stroke.
A. Wayne Wymore, 84, American mathematician and systems engineer.

25
Isidora Aguirre, 91, Chilean writer, internal hemorrhage.
Kamil Altan, 86, Turkish footballer.
Frank Bare Sr., 80,  American gymnast.
John Thomas Chambers, Jr., 82, American politician, only African-American Mayor of Annapolis (1981), heart attack.
Rick Coonce, 64, American drummer (The Grass Roots).
Aminath Faiza, 86, Maldivian poet and author.
Emanuel Fried, 97, American playwright and actor.
Peter Hildreth, 82, British Olympic hurdler, 1950 European Championships medalist.
István Jenei, 57, Hungarian Olympic sports shooter.
John Miner, 92, American attorney, prosecutor responsible for investigating the death of Marilyn Monroe.
Richard J. Naughton, 64, American vice admiral, Superintendent of the U.S. Naval Academy (2002–2003).
Eneas Perdomo, 80, Venezuelan folk singer.
Suze Rotolo, 67, American artist, lung cancer.
Carola Scarpa, 39, Brazilian socialite, multiple organ failure.

26
Abbas Amiri Moghaddam, 67, Iranian actor, car accident.
Kostas Andriopoulos, 26, Greek footballer (PAOK, Veria), leukemia.
María Azambuya, 66, Uruguayan actress and theatre director.
Judith Coplon, 89, American political analyst, convicted of espionage.
Susan Crosland, 84, American journalist, widow of Anthony Crosland.
Richard F. Daines, 60, American physician, Commissioner of the New York State Department of Health (2007–2010).
Jon Fitch, 60, American politician, Arkansas State Representative (1979–1983) and State Senator (1983–2002), complications of a stroke.
Eugene Fodor, 60, American violinist, cirrhosis.
Ed Frutig, 92, American football player (Green Bay Packers, Detroit Lions).
Greg Goossen, 65, American baseball player (New York Mets) and actor (Wyatt Earp, Unforgiven).
Bill Grigsby, 89, American radio sportscaster (Kansas City Chiefs), prostate cancer and fall.
Cynthia Holcomb Hall, 82, American circuit judge for the Court of Appeals for the Ninth Circuit (1984–1997), cancer.
Shawn Lee, 44, American football player (Miami Dolphins, Chicago Bears).
Arnošt Lustig, 84, Czech writer and Holocaust survivor, cancer.
James A. McClure, 86, American politician, U.S. Representative (1967–1973) and Senator from Idaho (1973–1991), following multiple strokes.
Dean Richards, 36, British footballer (Bradford City, Wolverhampton, Southampton, Tottenham).
Jorge Santoro, 66, Brazilian footballer, heart attack.
Roch Thériault, 63, Canadian cult leader and convicted murderer, murdered in prison.
Mark Tulin, 62, American bass player (The Electric Prunes, The Smashing Pumpkins), heart attack.
*Zhu Guangya, 86, Chinese nuclear physicist, helped develop nation's first atomic bomb.

27
Frank Alesia, 67, American actor and director (Pajama Party, Riot on Sunset Strip, C'mon, Let's Live a Little), natural causes.
Frank Buckles, 110, American supercentenarian soldier, last living U.S. World War I veteran, natural causes.
J. Elliot Cameron, 88, American educator and religious leader, natural causes.
Margaret Eliot, 97, British music teacher and musician.
Necmettin Erbakan, 84, Turkish politician, Prime Minister (1996–1997).
James Gruber, 82, American teacher and early gay rights activist, last surviving member of the Mattachine Society.
Maurice Guigue, 98, French football referee (1958 FIFA World Cup Final).
Eddie Kirkland, 88, American blues guitarist, car accident.
Oto Mádr, 94, Czech theologian and dissident.
Amparo Muñoz, 56, Spanish actress, Miss Universe 1974.
Skonk Nicholson, 94, South African teacher and rugby union coach (Maritzburg College, 1948–1982).
Emerson Rodwell, 89, Australian cricketer and soldier.
Moacyr Scliar, 73, Brazilian physician and writer, stroke.
Duke Snider, 84, American Baseball Hall of Famer (Brooklyn and Los Angeles Dodgers, New York Mets, San Francisco Giants).
Gary Winick, 49, American film director (13 Going on 30, Letters to Juliet, Charlotte's Web), pneumonia.

28
Netiva Ben-Yehuda, 82, Israeli author and radio personality.
Scott Cary, 87, American baseball player (Washington Senators).
Harvey Dorfman, 75, American sports psychologist.
Ernest Eastman, 83, Liberian diplomat, Foreign Minister (1983–1986), Secretary General of the Mano River Union.
John Ellis, 72, British trade unionist.
Emmy, 21, Albanian singer, vehicular homicide.
Annie Girardot, 79, French actress, Alzheimer's disease.
Peter J. Gomes, 69, American preacher, theologian and author, professor at Harvard Divinity School, brain aneurysm and heart attack.
Stan Holmes, 51, American baseball player, cancer.
Nick LaTour, 82, American singer and actor (Jingle All The Way, Don Juan DeMarco), complications from cancer.
Jozef Massy, 96, Belgian Olympic sprint canoer.
Günter Mast, 84, German businessman (Jägermeister).
Aracy de Carvalho Guimarães Rosa, 102, Brazilian diplomatic clerk, natural causes.
Jane Russell, 89, American actress (The Outlaw, Gentlemen Prefer Blondes), respiratory illness.
Jan van Schijndel, 83, Dutch footballer (1952 Summer Olympics).
Allan Williams, 88, Canadian politician, Attorney General of British Columbia (1979–1983), after long illness.
Wally Yonamine, 85, American baseball (Yomiuri Giants, Chunichi Dragons) and football player (San Francisco 49ers), prostate cancer.
Doyald Young, 84, American logotype designer, complications of heart surgery.

References

2011-02
 02